Indhiya Jananayaga Katchi  (IJK) (translated to Indian democratic party) is a political party in Tamil Nadu, India. It was founded by T. R. Pachamuthu, an academician and the founder of SRM Group of institutions. The main aim of the party is to abolish corruption and anti-social activities. The headquarters of the party is located in Chennai.
IJK contested in the 2014 General Elections through an alliance with the BJP-led NDA. 
IJK contested 2016 Tamil Nadu Assembly Elections through an alliance with the BJP-led NDA but couldn't register a single victory. 
IJK contested in the 2019 General Elections through an alliance with the DMK-led UPA. R. Pachamuthu alias T.R.Paarivendhar contested in Perambalur & won with a margin of 4,03,518 votes

References

External links
Official Website

2011 establishments in Tamil Nadu
Member parties of the United Progressive Alliance
Political parties established in 2011
Political parties in Tamil Nadu